Dinesh Daminda (born 23 October 1983) is a Sri Lankan cricketer. He has played 47 first-class and 30 List A matches for several domestic sides in Sri Lanka since 2004. He made his Twenty20 debut on 17 August 2004, for Ragama Cricket Club in the 2004 SLC Twenty20 Tournament. His last first-class match was for Chilaw Marians Cricket Club in the 2012–13 Premier Trophy on 30 March 2013.

See also
 List of Chilaw Marians Cricket Club players

References

External links
 

1983 births
Living people
Sri Lankan cricketers
Chilaw Marians Cricket Club cricketers
Ragama Cricket Club cricketers
Place of birth missing (living people)